Jakarta City Center or  JaCC is a mixed-use development complex consist of five towers and shopping mall, located at Tanah Abang in Jakarta, Indonesia. Land area of the complex is about 13.5 hectares. A wholesale shopping mall known as Thamrin City is located at the lower 9 floors of the complex, which is the largest and most comprehensive wholesale center in Jakarta. There are about 9000 shopping kiosk in the mall, which is one of the largest in Jakarta. JaCC will also be equipped with 10 large atria to hold various exhibitions and one convention hall for exhibitions (large scale events). The complex has food-court and a parking area for 6000 vehicles. There is one Amaris hotel in one of the apartments towers. The shopping center is housing many Indonesian Batik clothes shops. The complex has a land area of about 12.5 hectares.

There is accommodation on the 10th floor of Thamrin City. An Amaris hotel is located in one of the apartments towers.

Thamrin City Mall
The mall located at the lower 10 floors of the complex. Facilities include Banks, ATMs, places of worship, telephone networks of each kiosk, foodcourt, 20 escalator units and 14 passenger lifts units. The mall is popular for native Indonesian apparels.
Some of the tenant & retailer of the mall Kopi Oey, Hypermart, Sport Depot (PT Mitra Adi Perkasa), Gold's Gym, Matahari Department Store, Meatball Shoot, D'Cost Sea Food, Thamrin XXI, Muslim Fashion Center, Batik Nusantara Center, Timezone, Bank BRI, Bank Papua, Bank Victoria, Gallery ATM, ACE Hardware, inForma, Gramedia, Electronic Solution, Home Solution, JYSK Scandinavia, IKEA, Trans Studio Thamrin, Universal Studios, Fitness First, Amazone DLL.

External links
 City Center

See also
 List of tallest buildings in Jakarta

References

Shopping malls in Jakarta
Buildings and structures in Jakarta
Skyscraper office buildings in Indonesia
Post-independence architecture of Indonesia
Office buildings completed in 2012